Phaeax may refer to:
 Phaeax (architect), 5th century BC
 Phaeax (orator), 5th century BC
 Phaeax (mythology), son of Poseidon and Korkyra

See also
 Phaeax II a cargo ship built as